Thermomycolin (thermomycolase) is an enzyme. This enzyme catalyses the following chemical reaction

 Rather nonspecific hydrolysis of proteins. Preferential cleavage: Ala-, Tyr-, Phe- in small molecule substrates

This peptidase is isolated from the thermophilic fungus Malbranchea pulchella.

References

External links 
 

EC 3.4.21